The name Howard has been used for seven tropical cyclones in the Eastern Pacific Ocean.
 Hurricane Howard (1980) – Category 2
 Tropical Storm Howard (1986)
 Tropical Storm Howard (1992)
 Hurricane Howard (1998) – Category 4
 Hurricane Howard (2004) – Category 4
 Tropical Storm Howard (2016)
 Hurricane Howard (2022) – Category 1

Pacific hurricane set index articles